HMS Starfish was a  which served with the Royal Navy.  Built by Vickers, she was launched in 1895 and sold in 1912.

Construction and design
On 8 November 1893, the British Admiralty placed an order with the Naval Construction and Armament Company of Barrow-in-Furness (later to become part of Vickers) for three "Twenty-Seven Knotter" destroyers as part of the 1893–1894 construction programme for the Royal Navy, with in total, 36 destroyers being ordered from various shipbuilders for this programme.

The Admiralty only laid down a series of broad requirements for the destroyers, leaving detailed design to the ships' builders.

Three funnels were fitted, with the foremast between the ship's bridge and the first funnel. The ship's crew was 53 officers and men.

HMS Starfish was laid down on 22 March 1894 as the second of Naval Construction and Armament Company's three destroyers, and was launched on 26 January 1895. Starfish was commissioned in January 1896.

Service
Starfish served throughout her career in home waters, being prone to failures of her propeller brackets, which were made of forged scrap iron. In late January 1900 it was announced that she would be commissioned as tender to the gunnery school . In 1900–1901, Starfish was used in tests of a modified spar torpedo for use as an anti-submarine weapon.

Starfish was attached to the torpedo school  at Portsmouth in 1901, participating in the 1901 Naval Manoeuvres. She took part in the fleet review held at Spithead on 16 August 1902 for the coronation of King Edward VII. In April 1903, Starfish was used for trials of the use of kites designed by Samuel Cody for lifting radio antennae. On 26 October 1907 a minor collision took place between Starfish and the destroyer  at Devonport, both ships' hulls being dented.

Starfish was laid up at Devonport for disposal in 1910, and was sold for scrap to Thos. W. Ward of Preston on 15 May 1912.

Notes

Citations

Bibliography
 

 
 

Sturgeon-class destroyers
Ships built in Barrow-in-Furness
1895 ships
Victorian-era destroyers of the United Kingdom